
Gmina Suchań is an urban-rural gmina (administrative district) in Stargard County, West Pomeranian Voivodeship, in north-western Poland.

Villages
Apart from the town of Suchań, Gmina Suchań contains the villages and settlements of Brudzewice, Ininy, Kolonia Brudzewice, Kolonia Zaolzie, Modrzewo, Nosowo, Podłęcze, Sadłowo, Słodkówko, Słodkowo, Suchanki, Suchanówko, Tarnowo, Wapnica, Zastawie and Żukowo.

Neighbouring gminas
Gmina Suchań is bordered by the gminas of Choszczno, Dobrzany, Dolice, Marianowo, Recz and Stargard.

References
Polish official population figures 2006

Suchan
Stargard County